MV Sydney 2000 is a cruise ship operating on Sydney Harbour. It holds the title for being the largest cruise ship operating on the harbour. Built in 1998 by Oceanfast in Henderson, Western Australia, it soon commenced operations as a three deck and five private dining room floating restaurant. The ship is owned by Captain Cook Cruises.

On 18 July 2008, Sydney 2000 hosted Pope Benedict XVI on his journey from Rose Bay to Barangaroo for the official World Youth Day 2008 welcoming.

References

External links

Sydney 2000

Cruise ships of Australia
1998 ships
Floating restaurants
Ships built in Western Australia